Quercus sebifera is a species of oak. It is native to eastern and southern Mexico, where it occurs in Chiapas, Oaxaca, Puebla, Hidalgo, Querétaro, Tamaulipas, and Nuevo León.

References

sebifera
Endemic oaks of Mexico
Flora of the Sierra Madre Oriental
Flora of the Sierra Madre de Oaxaca
Flora of the Chiapas Highlands
Trees of Chiapas
Trees of Oaxaca
Trees of Puebla
Trees of Hidalgo (state)
Trees of Querétaro
Trees of Tamaulipas
Trees of Nuevo León
Least concern flora of North America
Plants described in 1924
Taxonomy articles created by Polbot
Taxa named by William Trelease